Honeyroot is an ambient dance collaboration between Glenn Gregory and Keith Lowndes, signed to the independent record label Just Music.

Career
The project had its origins in the 1997 album, Skyscraping, by ABC. As ABC was essentially Martin Fry, after the departure of founding member Mark White, Lowndes and fellow Sheffield native Gregory of Heaven 17, were brought in for co-songwriting duties on the album.

Lowndes and Gregory's first album, Sound Echo Location, was released in the UK and Australia in 2003 and in the US in 2004.

Honeyroot reached the UK Singles Chart in May 2005 with their ambient cover version of the Joy Division song, "Love Will Tear Us Apart", which also appeared in the Scottish film, Red Road. 2006 saw an online only release entitled "EP1".

The Sun Will Come (2007) featured two singles, the double A-sided, "Nobody Loves You (The Way I Do)" b/w "Heavy Drops" and "Where I Belong". Though known primarily as the front man for Heaven 17, Glenn Gregory sings on just two tracks on The Sun Will Come;  leaving remaining vocal duties to a variety of female singers including Briony Greenhill ("Nobody Loves You"), Kim Richey, Kerry Shaw, Elsie Wooley and Lindsay Crisp.

Discography

Albums
 Sound Echo Location (Just Music 2005)
 The Sun Will Come (Just Music 2007)
 Nobody Loves You (The Way I Do) & Heavy Drops (Just Music 2010)

Singles
Love Will Tear Us Apart (2005) - UK #70

References

External links
Official site
Glenn Gregory interview
BBC
Just Music
Honeyroot information

English dance music groups
Musical groups from Sheffield
English electronic music duos
Male musical duos
British ambient music groups
ABC (band)
Heaven 17